Qarxun (also, Karkhuk and Karkhun) is a village and municipality in the Quba Rayon of Azerbaijan.  It has a population of 1,101.  The municipality consists of the villages of Qarxun and Adur.

References

External links

Populated places in Quba District (Azerbaijan)